The Wisława Szymborska Award is a Polish annual international literature prize presented by the Wisława Szymborska Foundation. It was established in 2013, and was named in honour of the Nobel Prize-winning poet Wisława Szymborska (1923–2012). 

It is awarded to authors of best poetry works published the previous year. Both books written in Polish and translated into Polish are eligible for the award and can be submitted by the authors themselves, publishing houses, cultural institutions as well as members of the award committee. The award carries a cash prize of PLN 200,000 ($50,000) for the winner and PLN 50,000 ($15,000) for the translator, which makes it one of the most valued literary prizes in Poland.

Laureates

2021
Nominations:

Anna Adamowicz for Animalia
Justyna Bargielska for Dziecko z darów
Jakub Kornhauser for Dziewięć dni w ścianie
Joanna Mueller and Joanna Łańcucka for Waruj
Michał Sobol for Wieść

Winner: Anna Adamowicz

2020
Nominations:

Genowefa Jakubowska-Fijałkowska for Rośliny mięsożerne
Adam Kaczanowski for Zabawne i zbawienne
Tomasz Różycki for Kapitan X
Mirka Szychowiak for Uwaga, obiekt monitorowany
Urszula Zajączkowska for Piach

Winner: Genowefa Jakubowska-Fijałkowska

2019
Nominations:

Kamila Janiak for Wiersze przeciwko ludzkości ("Poems Against Humanity")
Piotr Janicki for Psia książka ("Dog's Book")
Marzanna Bogumiła Kielar for Nawigacje ("Navigations")
Robert Król for Polka
Marta Podgórnik for Mordercze ballady ("The Murderous Ballades")

Winner: Marta Podgórnik

2018
Nominations:

Wojciech Bonowicz for Druga ręka
Julia Fiedorczuk for Psalmy. 2014–2017
Natalia Malek for Kord
Marta Podgórnik for Zimna książka ("The Cold Book")
Ilona Witkowska for Lucyfer zwycięża

Winner: Julia Fiedorczuk

Best translation winner: Linn Hansen for Przejdź do historii (Sweden)

2017
Nominations:

Tomasz Bąk for [beep] generation
Jerzy Kronhold for Skok w dal ("Long Jump")
Tomasz Różycki for Litery ("Letters")
Marcin Sendecki for W
Eugeniusz Tkaczyszyn-Dycki for Nie dam ci siebie w żadnej postaci

Winner: Marcin Sendecki

2016
Nominations:

Jakub Kornhauser for Drożdżownia ("The Yeast Factory")
Edward Pasewicz for Och, Mitochondria
Marta Podgórnik for Zawsze ("Always")
Joanna Roszak for Tego dnia ("On That Day")
Marcin Świetlicki for Delta Dietla ("Dietl's Delta")

Winner: Jakub Kornhauser

2015
Nominations:

Roman Honet for Świat był mój ("The World Was Mine")
Jakobe Mansztajn for Studium przypadku ("The Case Study")
Mirosław Mrozek for Horyzont zdarzeń ("The Horizon of Events")
Jacek Podsiadło for Przez sen ("Through a Dream")
Maciej Robert for Księga meldunkowa ("The Registration Book")

Winner: ex aequo Roman Honet and Jacek Podsiadło

2014
Nominations:

Wojciech Bonowicz for Echa ("Echoes")
Jacek Dehnel for Języki obce ("Foreign Languages")
Mariusz Grzebalski for W innych okolicznościach ("In Other Circumstances")
Julia Hartwig for Zapisane
Michał Sobol for Pulsary ("Pulsars")

Winner: Julia Hartwig

2013
Nominations:

Justyna Bargielska for Bach for my baby
Krystyna Dąbrowska for Białe krzesła ("White Chairs")
Łukasz Jarosz for Pełna krew ("Full Blood")
Krzysztof Karasek for Dziennik rozbitka ("Journals of a Castaway")
Jan Polkowski for Głosy ("Voices")

Winner: ex aequo Krystyna Dąbrowska and Łukasz Jarosz

See also 
Nike Award
Silesius Poetry Award
Polish literature
List of Polish-language poets

References 

First book awards
Polish literary awards
Awards established in 2013
2013 establishments in Poland